Valery Georgiyevich Gazzaev (born 7 August 1954) is a Russian politician, football manager and former footballer of Ossetian descent. As a Soviet footballer he played the position of a striker enjoying successes with his team FC Dynamo Moscow as well as the USSR national football team in the Olympics.

Gazzaev became a coach in 1989. He was most successful when he was in charge in CSKA Moscow from 2004 to 2008. There Gazzaev won every possible Russian title three times each, as well as the 2005 UEFA Cup. He is considered one of the best football coaches to have emerged from the former Soviet Union because of these achievements.

Playing career

Soviet First League 

Gazzaev was born 7 August 1954 in Ordzhonikidze, USSR, now Vladikavkaz, Russia. He started his playing career as a forward for his native Spartak Ordzhonikidze in the Soviet First League. In 1974, he moved to SKA Rostov-on-Don, which got promoted from the Soviet First League to the Soviet Top League after a second-place finish at the end of the season. However, Gazzaev was left behind in the first league in Spartak Ordzhonikidze, as he wasn't one of the main players of the SKA Rostov-on-Don.

Soviet Top League 
In the Soviet Top League, Gazzaev played in Lokomotiv Moscow, Dynamo Moscow, and Dinamo Tbilisi.

Gazzaev is a Soviet Cup winner with Dynamo Moscow in 1984. During his career he scored 89 goals in 283 matches in Soviet Top League, and was the top goal scorer of the UEFA Cup Winners' Cup 1984–85.

International career 
He became the under-23 European champion with USSR in 1976 and under-21 European champion in 1980. He also won the bronze medal with USSR at the Summer Olympics in Moscow.

Coaching career 

After finishing his playing career in 1986 Gazzaev coached the youth team of Dynamo Moscow before moving to work with professional clubs. His first major success as a manager was winning the Russian championship with Spartak-Alania Vladikavkaz in 1995.

More titles followed after Gazzaev moved to coach CSKA Moscow. With them he won the 2004–05 UEFA Cup, as well as the Russian Premier League in 2003, 2005 and 2006 and the Russian Cup in 2002, 2005, and 2006, on 5 December 2008 left PFC CSKA Moscow. Gazzaev's CSKA Moscow team was the first side from the Russian Federation to win a European competition since the fall of the Soviet Union.

On 26 May 2009, the former CSKA Moscow coach was named as the new head coach of Dynamo Kyiv, who signed a three years contract also until 2012.

After a spell as Dynamo Kyiv head coach he returned to Vladikavkaz and became president (2011) and then also manager (November 2012) of Alania Vladikavkaz. In February 2014, the football club "Alania", led by Gazzaev, ceased to exist and pulled out of the 2013–14 Russia First Division, due to financial liquidation and sponsorship problems, and the club was dissolved.

Managerial statistics

Politics
In 2016, he was elected to the State Duma as a member of A Just Russia party.

Personal life 
He is a cousin of Yuri Gazzaev and father of Vladimir Gazzayev, both of them football coaches as well.

Honours

Player 
Dynamo Moscow
Soviet Top League: 1976
Soviet Cup: 1977, 1984
Soviet Super Cup: 1977
Ciutat de Barcelona Trophy: 1976

Manager 
Spartak-Alania Vladikavkaz
 Russian Top League: 1995

PFC CSKA Moscow
 Russian Premier League: 2003, 2005, 2006
 Russian Cup: 2001–02, 2004–05, 2005–06
 Russian Super Cup: 2004, 2006, 2007
 UEFA Cup: 2004–05

FC Dynamo Kyiv
 Ukrainian Super Cup: 2009

Individual
European Football Coach of the Season: 2004–05
Order of Friendship
Order of Honour

See also
List of UEFA Cup winning managers

References

External links
Biography by International united biographical centre 
Profile at RussiaTeam 

Kutafin Moscow State Law University alumni
UEFA Cup winning managers
Soviet footballers
Soviet Top League players
Soviet First League players
FC Spartak Vladikavkaz players
FC SKA Rostov-on-Don players
FC Lokomotiv Moscow players
FC Dynamo Moscow players
Soviet Union international footballers
Olympic footballers of the Soviet Union
Olympic bronze medalists for the Soviet Union
Footballers at the 1980 Summer Olympics
Soviet football managers
Russian footballers
Russian football managers
Russian expatriate football managers
1954 births
Living people
FC Spartak Vladikavkaz managers
FC Dynamo Moscow managers
PFC CSKA Moscow managers
FC Dynamo Kyiv managers
Russian Premier League managers
Russia national football team managers
Sportspeople from Vladikavkaz
Ossetian people
Ukrainian Premier League managers
Olympic medalists in football
Russian expatriate sportspeople in Ukraine
Expatriate football managers in Ukraine
Honoured Coaches of Russia
Medalists at the 1980 Summer Olympics
Seventh convocation members of the State Duma (Russian Federation)
A Just Russia politicians
21st-century Russian politicians
Russian sportsperson-politicians
Association football forwards